A by-election for the Islamic Consultative Assembly's constituency Tehran, Rey, Shemiranat and Eslamshahr was held on 15 December 2006, to fill two vacancies caused by resignation of Davoud Danesh-Jafari and Manouchehr Mottaki, who were appointed as finance and foreign ministers respectively. The voters in Tehran cast their ballots along with the nationwide Assembly of Experts election and the Tehran City Council election.

The two seats went to conservative Hassan Ghafourifard and reformist Soheila Jolodarzadeh, who were placed the first and the second respectively in a plurality-at-large voting system.

Results 
The top sixteen candidates who ran for the seats, were:

References 

Parliamentary elections in Tehran
By-elections in Iran
2006 elections in Iran